Idrissa Camara may refer to:

 Idrissa Camara (dancer), Guinean dancer and choreographer
 Idrissa Camará (born 1992), Bissau-Guinean footballer winger
 Idrissa Camara (footballer) (born 1998), Senegalese football winger